An All-American team is an honorary sports team composed of the best amateur players of a specific season for each position—who in turn are given the honorific "All-America" and typically referred to as "All-American athletes", or simply "All-Americans".  Although the honorees generally do not compete as a unit, the term is used in U.S. team sports to refer to players who are selected by members of the national media.  Walter Camp selected the first All-America team in the early days of American football in 1889.  In 1950, the American Baseball Coaches Association (ABCA) selected its first All-American baseball team.  It has since chosen All-American teams and a player of the year for each division (National Collegiate Athletic Association (NCAA) Division I, Division II, Division III, National Association of Intercollegiate Athletics, junior college and high school). In 1991, Collegiate Baseball began selecting college All-American, Freshman All-American, and High School All-American teams.  Baseball America has selected – since 1981 – pre-season and post-season All-American teams and College Player of the Year honorees.

Various organizations selected All-American lists of the best players for the 1991 NCAA Division I college baseball season. The ABCA, the magazine Baseball America, and Collegiate Baseball were the NCAA-sanctioned selectors.  This list only includes players selected to the post-season All-American first team for each selector.  However, many All-American selections choose second, third, etc. teams from the remaining eligible candidates.

Accomplishments
Bobby Jones was selected as player of the year by both American Baseball Coaches Association and Collegiate Baseball, while David McCarty was the Baseball America player of the year.  Brooks Kieschnick went on to be a repeat All-American selection on the 1992 and 1993 teams and be named a player of the year both years.  Mike Kelly, who had been 1990 Baseball America player of the year, returned from the 1990 team, along with Phillip Stidham. Kelly won the 1990 Rotary Smith Award and Jones won the award in 1991. Kelly also won the 1991 Golden Spikes Award.

This class produced one Major League Baseball All-Star, one Olympic Games gold medalist and one Major League Baseball record holder. A total of five players were selected by all three NCAA-sanctioned selectors: pitchers Jones and Kennie Steenstra, first baseman David McCarty, shortstop Brent Gates and outfielder Kelly.  Four school had two members of the team: Long Beach State, Pepperdine, Villanova and Wichita State

Jones led the National League in sacrifice hits allowed during the 1995 season. The following year, he was selected for the 1996 MLB All-Star Game.  However, in the 2001 Major League Baseball season, Jones led the National League in home runs allowed and losses.  During the 1995 season, Gates finished second in the American League in sacrifice flies and third in assists.  During the 1998 season, Kelly had a perfect fielding percentage with 137 putouts and 4 assists for a total of 141 chances.  Mike Neill, whose first-inning home run put the United States ahead to stay in the championship game, earned a gold medal in baseball at the 2000 Summer Olympics.  During the 2004 season, Mark Sweeney had five pinch-hit home runs, two shy of the major league record.  During the 2007 Major League Baseball season, Sweeney, who ranks second in career pinch hits with 175 and first in career pinch-hit runs batted in with 102, led the major leagues with 24 pinch hits.

Key

Team lists
Below are the Division I players selected to the various NCAA-sanctioned lists. The default list order is arranged by the position numbers used by official baseball scorekeepers (i.e., etc.).

References
General

Inline citations

College Baseball All-America Teams
All-America